Anarchy Club is an alternative rock/electronica duo from Boston, Massachusetts. The band consists of vocalist/guitarist Keith Smith, who is a former member of the band C60, and Adam von Buhler, who plays guitar (including all solos), bass, drums, and other instruments, and is a former member of the band Splashdown.

History
Friends Adam von Buhler and Keith Smith formed the band in the winter of 2004.

Their debut album, The Way and Its Power, was released in 2005.

The album contained the song "Behind the Mask," which appeared in the PlayStation 2 game Guitar Hero as a bonus track. Smith was an employee of Harmonix Music Systems until 2010, and von Buhler's former bandmate, Kasson Crooker, is its audio director.

"Collide" (from their 2007 release, A Single Drop of Red) is a bonus track for Guitar Hero II. Of the 24 bonus tracks in the game, GameSpy named "Collide" as one of the five best.

"Blood Doll" is an unlockable track from the MTV/Harmonix game Rock Band.

"Get Clean" is an in-game track from the MTV/Harmonix game Rock Band 2, featured in the "Impossible" section.

Pre-Anarchy Club
During Keith's time in C60, that band won 6 Boston music awards (5 of them in one year) and shared stages with bands such as Kiss, Run DMC, Linkin Park, Rage Against the Machine and others. Some of their songs were also featured in the TV shows Dawson's Creek and The Shield.

Meanwhile, Adam worked with the band Splashdown, and recorded an unreleased album with producer Glen Ballard.  During his time signed to Capitol Records, he toured the country with Splashdown and had several songs in movies (Titan A.E. and others) and television shows (Charmed, Angel and many more).

A Single Drop of Red (2007)
Anarchy Club released their second CD, A Single Drop of Red, in December 2007.   The record was an EP featuring 5 new tracks (including "Collide", not previously available on CD), and 6 remixes of fan favorites from "The Way and its Power".  The song "Blood Doll" from this CD additionally appeared as a bonus track in Harmonix's music video game Rock Band which came out later that year.  In the PS2 version of the game, Keith and Adam appear as characters on stage during the performance of "Blood Doll".

The Art of War (2009)
The duo released their second full-length CD (and third overall), The Art of War, in October 2009.  At the same time, two Anarchy Club songs, "Blood Doll" and "Get Clean", appeared as DLC in the iPhone and iPad versions of the official Rock Band game.

Life In The Underground (2012)
On May 31, 2012, the duo released their third full album, "Life In The Underground".   Also in 2012, many previously released Anarchy Club songs began to appear as downloadable content for the Rock Band Network.

Dead Star Cult (2020)
In 2019, Keith posted on the band's blog that he'd been feeling boxed-in creatively by the Anarchy Club concept. So he and Adam decided to start over from scratch, launching the new band Dead Star Cult.

Band members

Studio Line-up
Keith Smith - vocals, guitar (2004–present)
Adam von Buhler - bass, guitar, guitar solos, drums, keyboards, synths, programming (2004–present)

Touring line-up [2015 edition]
Keith Smith - lead vocals/guitar
Adam von Buhler - lead guitar
Caleb Wheeler - drums
Phill Hunt - guitar
DC Park - bass

Discography

References

External links
 Official site
 French fansite

Musical groups from Boston
Musical groups established in 2004